Keyesport is a village in Bond and Clinton counties, Illinois, United States. The population was 406 at the 2020 census.

History
Keyesport was named in honor of its postmaster, Thomas Keyes. It is on the boundary between Clinton County and Bond counties. It was incorporated as a village in 1887.

Geography
Keyesport is situated on the western shore of Carlyle Lake.

Demographics

As of the 2020 census there were 406 people, 194 households, and 147 families residing in the village. The racial makeup of the village was 92.36% White, 0.25% Native American, 0.49% Asian, 1.48% from other races, and 5.42% from two or more races. Hispanic or Latino of any race were 0.74% of the population.

There were 194 households, out of which 29.90% had children under the age of 18 living with them, 36.60% were married couples living together, 28.35% had a female householder with no husband present, and 24.23% were non-families. 23.20% of all households were made up of individuals, and 7.73% had someone living alone who was 65 years of age or older. The average household size was 2.52 and the average family size was 2.54.

The village's age distribution consisted of 21.7% under the age of 18, 6.3% from 18 to 24, 21.2% from 25 to 44, 34.3% from 45 to 64, and 16.4% who were 65 years of age or older. The median age was 45.1 years. For every 100 females, there were 87.5 males. For every 100 females age 18 and over, there were 78.7 males.

The median income for a household in the village was $33,629, and the median income for a family was $33,750. Males had a median income of $21,250 versus $19,390 for females. The per capita income for the village was $16,786. About 10.9% of families and 28.7% of the population were below the poverty line, including 44.0% of those under age 18 and 22.2% of those age 65 or over.

Notable people 

 Wilbur Clark, builder and owner of Desert Inn hotel and casino in Las Vegas
 Frank Harter, pitcher for the Cincinnati Reds and Indianapolis Hoosiers

References

External links

Villages in Bond County, Illinois
Villages in Clinton County, Illinois
Villages in Illinois
Populated places established in 1887
1887 establishments in Illinois